The 2016–17 Iranian Futsal Super League are the 18th season of the Iran Pro League and the 13th under the name Futsal Super League. Tasisat Daryaei are the defending champions. The season will feature 12 teams from the 2015–16 Iranian Futsal Super League and two new teams promoted from the 2015–16 Iran Futsal's 1st Division: Labaniyat Arjan and Shahrdari.

Teams

Stadia, locations and Personnel

Number of teams by region

Managerial changes

League standings

Positions by round

Results table

Clubs season-progress

Awards 

 Winner: Giti Pasand
 Runners-up: Dabiri
 Third-Place: Mes Sungun
 Top scorer:  Mahdi Javid (Giti Pasand) (36 goals)
 Best Player:  Ali Asghar Hassanzadeh (Giti Pasand)
 Best Manager:  Reza Lak Aliabadi (Giti Pasand)
 Best Goal Keeper:  Sepehr Mohammadi (Giti Pasand)
 Best Young Player:  Moslem Oladghobad  (Shahrdari Saveh)
 Best Team: Giti Pasand
 Fairplay Man:  Mohammad Taheri (Shahrvand)
 Fairplay Team: Farsh Ara

See also 
 2016–17 Iran Futsal's 1st Division
 2017 Futsal's 2nd Division
 2016–17 Persian Gulf Cup
 2016–17 Azadegan League
 2016–17 Iran Football's 2nd Division
 2016–17 Iran Football's 3rd Division
 2016–17 Hazfi Cup
 Iranian Super Cup 2016

References

External links 
 Iran Futsal League on PersianLeague 
 Futsal Planet 
 Iranian Futsal News Agency 

Iranian Futsal Super League seasons
1